Gardelle is a surname. Notable people with the surname include:

 Camille Gardelle (1866–1947), French architect
 Robert Gardelle (1682–1766), Swiss artist
 Theodore Gardelle (1722–1761), Swiss painter and enameler
 Yvonne Gardelle (1897–1979), American actress and artist's model